Kingpin: How One Hacker Took Over the Billion-Dollar Cybercrime Underground is a 2011 non-fiction book written by Kevin Poulsen.

Plot
Poulsen tells the story of real life computer hacker Max Butler, who, under the alias Iceman, stole access to 1.8 million credit card accounts.

References

2011 non-fiction books
American non-fiction books
Works about computer hacking
Non-fiction books about criminals
Crown Publishing Group books